The Kokemäenjoki ("Kokemäki River") is a river in southwestern Finland.

Geography
The river originates at Lake Liekovesi in the Pirkanmaa region, and flows  to the Gulf of Bothnia at Pori in the Satakunta region. Primary tributaries of Kokemäenjoki are the Loimijoki, Kauvatsanjoki and Harjunpäänjoki rivers.

See also
Kokemäki Castle
Kyrösjärvi
Kulovesi
Längelmävesi
Rautavesi (Sastamala)
Index: Kokemäenjoki basin
List of rivers of Finland

References

External links 

Kokemäenjoki-LIFE — a project for the restoration and management of valuable natural sites along the Kokemäenjoki River.
http://www.kokemaenjoki.fi/etusivu/kokemaenjoki - in Finnish
http://www.pilvivene.com/suurijoki/ - in Finnish

 
Rivers of Finland
Landforms of Pirkanmaa
Landforms of Satakunta